Celta Vigo contested La Liga and the Copa del Rey in the 1995–96 season. They placed 11th in La Liga, matching their best result since earning promotion in 1992. They were eliminated at the round of 16 stage in the Copa del Rey, losing 4–1 on aggregate to Valencia.

Squad

Squad stats 
Last updated on 23 February 2021.

|}

Results

La Liga

League table

Matches

Copa del Rey

Second round 

Celta Vigo won 2–1 on aggregate

Third round 

Celta Vigo won 7–0 on aggregate

Round of 16 

Valencia won 4–1 on aggregate

References

External links 
Spain 1995/96 at RSSSF

RC Celta de Vigo seasons
Celta